Brian George Mundee (born 12 January 1964) is an English retired professional football left back who made over 100 appearances in the Football League for Northampton Town, Cambridge United and Bournemouth. He later played European football for Maltese Premier League side Hamrun Spartans.

Personal life 
Mundee is the older brother of former footballer Denny Mundee.

References

English footballers
English Football League players
Living people
1964 births
Footballers from Hammersmith
Association football fullbacks
AFC Bournemouth players
Northampton Town F.C. players
Cambridge United F.C. players
Maidstone United F.C. (1897) players
National League (English football) players
Salisbury City F.C. players
Ħamrun Spartans F.C. players
Maltese Premier League players
English expatriate footballers
English expatriate sportspeople in Malta
Weymouth F.C. players
Southern Football League players
Basingstoke Town F.C. players
Isthmian League players
Bournemouth F.C. players
Poole Town F.C. players
Expatriate footballers in Malta